Tim Miller (born December 20, 1965) is a Minnesota politician and member of the Minnesota House of Representatives. A member of the Republican Party of Minnesota, he represents District 17A in the west-central Minnesota.

Early life and education
Miller was raised in Streamwood, Illinois. He attended the University of Iowa, graduating with a B.S.

Minnesota House of Representatives
Miller was first elected to the Minnesota House of Representatives in 2014. In December 2018, Miller, along with three other House members, formed a separate 'New House Republican Caucus' out of dissatisfaction with the House minority leadership. Miller wrote a letter to his GOP colleagues stating that "the attitudes and actions by the HRC leader and some of his supporters have become too hostile toward me" and pledged to continue opposing "radical liberalism".

Electoral history

Personal life
Miller and his wife Cherie have seven children and reside in Prinsburg, Minnesota.

References

External links

Rep. Tim Miller official Minnesota House of Representatives website
Tim Miller official campaign website

1965 births
Living people
Republican Party members of the Minnesota House of Representatives
University of Iowa alumni
People from Kandiyohi County, Minnesota
21st-century American politicians
People from Streamwood, Illinois